N.A.T.I.O.N. (pronounced "Nation" by band members in interview) is the second studio album by the American heavy metal band Bad Wolves. It was released through Eleven Seven Music on October 25, 2019. It is supported by the singles "Learn to Walk Again", "Sober" and "Killing Me Slowly". Bad Wolves promoted the album as a support act on Five Finger Death Punch's headline arena tour with Fire from the Gods and Three Days Grace in November 2019. It is the last album to feature vocalist Tommy Vext, after his departure from the band in January 2021. Loudwire named it one of the 50 best rock albums of 2019.

Background
The band stated that the album features a more "focused" sound than their debut, 2018's Disobey. Guitarist Doc Coyle called the record "diverse", saying that "There's stuff that's probably heavier, as or more heavy than the last record... And then there's some really catchy, kind of more mainstream stuff to cover that end of it, and a lot of stuff in the middle."

Track listing

Charts

References

2019 albums
Bad Wolves albums
Eleven Seven Label Group albums